Egyptian-style theatres are based on the traditional and historic design elements of Ancient Egypt.

The first Egyptian Theatre to be constructed in the US – which inspired many of the identically-named theatres that followed it – was Grauman's Egyptian Theatre in Hollywood, California. For several years, Hollywood developer Charles E. Toberman attempted to convince Sid Grauman to locate in Hollywood. During a meeting, Sid told Mr. Toberman of his desire to build a theatre of Egyptian design. Mr. Toberman then secured a piece of property on Hollywood Boulevard, just east of McCadden Place. The architectural firm of Meyer & Holler were hired to design the theatre. The result was Grauman's Egyptian Theatre with a seating of 1770. The approach to the theatre was through a courtyard in an ornate style evoking ancient Egypt, while inside, the stage was flanked by carved columns and models of the Sphinx. 

The theatre was opened on October 19, 1922 with the grand premiere of "Robin Hood" starring Douglas Fairbanks. In a 1983 article in Hollywood Studio Magazine, Mike Hughes wrote of the Egyptian: "A survivor of the decay that unfortunately characterizes the Hollywood Boulevard of today, the Egyptian is a reminder of the glamour that once made the Boulevard famous. Perhaps through the dedicated efforts of such citizens as Bruce Torrence, author of Hollywood: The First 100 Years and grandson of Mr. Charles Toberman, who built the Egyptian, the Hollywood Boulevard of yesteryear will reappear some great day in the future. When that happens, the Egyptian Theatre, jewel that it is, will be there to herald in the new age of film town."" United Artists was the last owner of the Egyptian Theatre before it closed in 1992. The American Cinematheque purchased the theatre from the city for $1 with the provision "that this historical landmark would be restored to its original grandeur and re-opened as a movie theatre showcasing the organization's celebrated public programming."

The Eldorado Theatre located in Eldorado Amusement Park, Weehawken, New Jersey opened in 1891 and featured 'Egypt Through Centuries' each evening.  The creators of the park, Palisades Amusement and Exhibition Company, published a book titled "Egypt Through the Centuries" in 1892.

Many of the other theatres that copied Grauman's Egyptian Theatre were part of the wave of Egyptian Revival architecture that occurred after the November 1922 discovery of King Tut's tomb by Howard Carter.

Unlike the many theatres that followed in its wake, Grauman's Egyptian Theatre was designed, built, named and opened before the 1922 discovery of King Tut's tomb. The news of the tomb's discovery reached the US a few weeks after the theatre opened.

Early in the 20th century, it is estimated that up to 100 of these theatre types were constructed across the US. Many of them no longer exist, but there are many fine examples of this style still in use today. Conrad Schmitt Studios has played a big part in the restoration of these atmospheric theatres, including Egyptian Theatres in Park City, Utah; Ogden, Utah; Boise, Idaho; Delta, Colorado; and DeKalb, Illinois.

Theatres in this style
Sorted by date of first opening.

Grauman's Egyptian Theatre, Hollywood, California, 1922 – Active
Bush Egyptian Theatre, San Diego, California, 1923 – Demolished 2003
Peery's Egyptian Theatre, Ogden, Utah, 1924 – Active
Egyptian Theatre, Coos Bay, Oregon, 1925 – Active
Mary G. Steiner Egyptian Theatre, Park City, Utah, 1926 – Active
Bala Theater, Bala Cynwyd, Pennsylvania, 1926 – Closed 2014
Capitol Center for the Arts, Concord, New Hampshire, 1927 – Active
The Egyptian Theatre, Boise, Idaho, 1927 – Active
Empress Theatre, Montreal, Quebec, Canada, 1927 – Closed 1992
Egyptian Theatre, Delta, Colorado, 1928 – Active
Egyptian Theatre, DeKalb, Illinois, 1929 – Active
The Moore Egyptian, Seattle, Washington, 1975 – 1980
SIFF Cinema Egyptian (The Egyptian Theater before 2014), Seattle, Washington, 1981 – Active
Cinemark Egyptian 24 and XD, Hanover, Maryland, 2000 - Active

See also
Egyptomania

Notes

Egyptian Revival architecture